I. portoricensis may refer to:

 Icterus portoricensis, a New World blackbird
 Isolobodon portoricensis, an extinct rodent